Romulus "Romică" Buia (born 15 June 1970 in Baia Mare) is a Romanian former football player and currently a manager. He was nicknamed "Figo from Berceni" by the fans of Rocar București which played the home games on the "Drumul Găzarului" field in the Berceni Neighborhood in Bucharest, because of the similarities with the Portuguese football star Luís Figo. His son Darius Buia is also a footballer.

Career
Buia made his professional debut at the age of 18, playing for Minerul Cavnic in the Romanian Divizia B, before joining FC Baia Mare at the age of 19, a club also from Divizia B.

In 1991, at the age of 21, he made international debut against United States in a friendly game. He also played for Romania national football team in 1992, this time against Mexico.

FC Barcelona paid a close attention to him during the 1991–92 season. In the summer of 1992, Johan Cruijff, the Catalan side coach, invited him to train with the team but in the end the transfer did not materialised.

Buia started the 1992–93 at FC Baia Mare but was then transferred to Germinal Ekeren (3550) of Belgium during the season. He played in Belgium for two years, before being loaned back to Romania, this time at Universitatea Craiova, therefore making his debut in Romanian top league, Divizia A. In 1995, he returned to Ekeren but after at half season he terminated his contract and returned in Romania, signing a contract with Sportul Studenţesc of Bucharest, before joining again Universitatea Craiova for two seasons.

In 1998 his contract with Universitatea Craiova terminated and he failed to find another one with a top team, and therefore played for Progresul Şomcuta Mare, a team from the Romanian fourth division.

In 2000, he returned to Divizia A after signing a contract with Rocar București. After only a year he joined Dinamo București but left the team at the end of 2001 to play for Gloria Bistriţa.

In 2002, he was signed by Politehnica Timișoara, where he stayed until 2005, before being sacked by the new Timișoara coach, Cosmin Olăroiu and subsequently joining Pandurii Târgu Jiu.

In the season 2005–06 he played at FCM Reșița in Liga II before signing for AS Covaci in Romanian Liga IV.

Between 2007 and 2011 he played for FC Chişoda in Liga IV and FCMU Baia Mare in Liga III.

Then he became the manager of FCMU Baia Mare between 2011 and 2013 until the dissolution of the club.

From July 2015, he is the manager of Liga III club, ACSF Comuna Recea.

References

External links

1970 births
Romanian footballers
Romania international footballers
Association football forwards
Living people
Sportspeople from Baia Mare
CS Minaur Baia Mare (football) players
Beerschot A.C. players
FC U Craiova 1948 players
FC Sportul Studențesc București players
AFC Rocar București players
FC Dinamo București players
ACF Gloria Bistrița players
FC Politehnica Timișoara players
CS Pandurii Târgu Jiu players
CS Minaur Baia Mare (football) managers
CS Academica Recea managers
Expatriate footballers in Belgium
Liga I players
Romanian football managers